Oberea praemortua is an extinct species of beetle in the family Cerambycidae, that existed in what is now Germany during the Upper Oligocene. It was described by Heyden in 1862.

References

Beetles described in 1862
praemortua